Melvin C. Warren (1920 – 1995) was an American painter and sculptor of the American West.

Life
Warren was born on March 19, 1920. He joined the United States Air Force and later graduated from Texas Christian University.

Warren worked on a ranch in Baylor County, Texas, where he became a painter of the American West, especially cowboys. From 1968 to 1995, he was a member of the Cowboy Artists of America, from which he won a gold medal. He also designed statues, like the miniature deer bronzes he did for governors at the 1974 Southern Governors' Conference. President Lyndon B. Johnson collected his artwork.

Warren died in 1995.

References

External links

1920 births
1995 deaths
People from Baylor County, Texas
Texas Christian University alumni
Painters from Texas
American male painters
20th-century American painters
American male sculptors
20th-century American sculptors
20th-century American male artists
Artists of the American West